Kovai (Kobai, Kowai) is a Papuan language spoken on Umboi Island, halfway between mainland Papua New Guinea and the island of New Britain, and mostly within the caldera of that volcanic island.

Phonology

Vowels 

 Vowels may be heard as lax [ɪ ɛ ʌ ɔ ʊ] when in closed syllables.

Consonants 

 In word-final position /b ɡ/ can be heard as devoiced [b̥ ɡ̊], and may also be realized as fricatives [β ɣ] in intervocalic positions.

References

External links 

Languages of Morobe Province
Huon languages